"Crying Over You" is a song written by Al Peshoff and Mark Dee, sung by Webb Pierce, and released on the Decca label. In May 1958, it peaked at No. 3 on Billboards country and western jockey chart. It spent 17 weeks on the charts and was also ranked No. 31 on Billboards 1958 year-end country and western chart.

See also
 Billboard year-end top 50 country & western singles of 1958

References

Webb Pierce songs
1958 songs